Education Act (with its variations) is a stock short title used for legislation in Australia, Hong Kong, India, Malaysia, New Zealand, the United Kingdom and the United States that relates to education. The Bill for an Act with this short title will have been known as a Education Bill during its passage through Parliament.

The Education Acts may be a generic name either for legislation bearing that short title or for all legislation which relates to education.

List

Australia
The 1893 Education Act of Western Australia
The Education Act 1872 (Vic)

Hong Kong
The Education Ordinance 1971

India
Kerala Education Bill, 1957
Education Bill that became the Indian Right of Children to Free and Compulsory Education Act of 2009

Malaysia
The Education Act 1996

New Zealand
The Education Act 1877
The Education Act 1914

United Kingdom
The Education Act 1833
The Elementary Education Acts 1870 to 1893, the collective title of the following Acts:
The Elementary Education Act 1870 (33 & 34 Vict c 75) - the Forster Act
The Elementary Education Act 1873 (36 & 37 Vict c 86)
The Elementary Education Act 1876 (39 & 40 Vict c 70) - the Sandon Act
The Elementary Education (Industrial Schools) Act 1879 (42 & 43 Vict c 48)
The Elementary Education Act 1880 (43 & 44 Vict c 23) - the Mundella Act
The Education Code Act 1890 (53 & 54 Vict c 22)
The Elementary Education Act 1891 (54 & 55 Vict c 56)
The Elementary Education (Blind and Deaf Children) Act 1893 (56 & 57 Vict c 42)
The Elementary Education (School Attendance) Act 1893 (56 & 57 Vict c 51)
The Elementary Education Act 1901
The Education Act 1901
The Education Act 1901 (Renewal) Act 1902
The Education Act 1902 - sometimes known as the Balfour Act
The Education (Provision of Meals) Act 1906
The Education (Administrative Provisions) Act 1907
The Education Act 1918 - sometimes known as the Fisher Act
The Education Act 1936 
The Education Act 1944 - sometimes known as the Butler Act
The Education (Miscellaneous Provisions) Act 1948 (repealed 1.11.1996)
The Education Act 1964
The Education Act 1968
The Education Act 1976
The Education Act 1979
The Education Act 1980
The Education Act 1981
The Education (No. 2) Act 1986
The Education Reform Act 1988
The Further and Higher Education Act 1992
The Education Act 1994
The Education Act 1996
The School Standards and Framework Act 1998
The Teaching and Higher Education Act 1998
The Education Act 2002
The Higher Education Act 2004
The Education Act 2005
The Education and Inspections Act 2006
The Education Act 2011

Scotland
The Education Act 1496
The School Establishment Act 1616
The Education Act 1633
The Education Act 1646
The Education Act 1696
The Education (Scotland) Act 1980
The Further and Higher Education (Scotland) Act 1992
The Education (Additional Support for Learning) (Scotland) Act 2004 - an Act of the Scottish Parliament
The Education (Additional Support for Learning) (Scotland) Act 2009 - an Act of the Scottish Parliament

The Education (Scotland) Acts 1872 to 1893 was the collective title of the following Acts:
The Education (Scotland) Act 1872 (35 & 36 Vict c 62)
The Education (Scotland) Act 1878 (41 & 42 Vict c 78)
The Public Schools (Scotland) Teachers Act 1882 (45 & 46 Vict c 18)
The Education (Scotland) Act 1883 (46 & 47 Vict c 56)
The Parliamentary Grant (Caithness and Sutherland) Act 1889 (52 & 53 Vict c 75)
The Education of Blind and Death-Mute Children (Scotland) Act 1890 (53 & 54 Vict c 43)
The Day Industrial Schools (Scotland) Act 1893 (56 & 57 Vict c 12)

Ireland
The Education Act 1695 - Act of the Parliament of Ireland

United States
The Higher Education Act of 1965
The Elementary and Secondary Education Act of 1965
Florida House Bill 1069

See also
List of short titles

References

Lists of legislation by short title
Set index articles